Dushman Devta  is a 1991 Bollywood film directed by Anil Ganguly, and starring Dharmendra, Dimple Kapadia, Aditya Pancholi, Sonam and music by Bappi Lahiri.

Plot

A small town in rural India is being terrorized by wild animals and bandits. No one is able to stop them from killing and looting the residents. The only one who was able to stand against the bandits was master Dina Nath, but he was arrested and is imprisoned. When Dina Nath returns home, he befriends a young man by the name of Shiva and asks him to protect this town. Subsequently, Dina Nath is killed. Shiva is blamed for Dina Nath's death by the townspeople, severely beaten, and left for dead. But some compassionate townspeople rescue him as they think he is Lord Shiva reincarnated to save their town. They do not know that Shiva is an escaped convict, and by playing God to the simple-minded townspeople, he is merely whiling for time, so that he can carry out his very own secret agenda.

Cast
 Dharmendra as Shiva
 Dimple Kapadia as Gauri
 Aditya Pancholi as Suraj
 Sonam as Ganga
 Sadashiv Amrapurkar as Raja
 Gulshan Grover as Garjan Singh
 Jankidas as Pandit
 Shreeram Lagoo as Master Dinanath
 Sulbha Deshpande as Mrs. Dinanath
 Ajit Vachani as Inspector Basermal

Soundtrack

External links
 
 

1991 films
1990s Hindi-language films
Films scored by Bappi Lahiri
Films directed by Anil Ganguly